Necopidem is a drug in the imidazopyridine family, which is related to the better known drugs zolpidem and alpidem. It is therefore considered a nonbenzodiazepine and as such may have sedative and anxiolytic effects, given its structural similarity to other nonbenzodiazepine hypnotics.

References 

Carboxamides
GABAA receptor positive allosteric modulators
Imidazopyridines
Sedatives